David Meltzer may refer to:

David Meltzer (poet) (1937–2016), American poet
David J. Meltzer (born 1955), American archaeologist
David O. Meltzer (born 1964), American medical professor
Dave Meltzer (born 1959), American journalist